Korean Sign Language or KSL ( or ) is a sign language used for deaf communities of South Korea under the North-South Korean border.

KSL is currently one of two official languages in South Korea along with Korean.

Beginnings
The beginnings of KSL date from 1889, although standardization efforts have only begun in 2000. The first South Korean school for the Deaf was established on April 1, 1913, in Seoul, and it was renamed as the National School for the Deaf in 1945, to be later renamed the Seoul School for the Deaf in 1951.

Commonality
Although the origins of KSL predate the Japanese colonial period (de jure beginning 1910), the sign language developed some features in common with Japanese Sign Language (JSL) grammar when Korea was under Japanese rule.  KSL is considered part of the Japanese Sign Language family.

Users

According to the South Korean Ministry of Health and Welfare, there were 252,779 people with hearing impairment and 18,275 people with language disorders in South Korea as of late 2014. Recent estimated figures for the number of Deaf people in South Korea range from 180,000 to 300,000.

Official status 
On 31 December 2015, the South Korean National Assembly passed Legislation to recognize Korean Sign Language as one of Korea's official languages. There were two bills and two policies passed under this legislation which were "Korean Sign Language Standard Policy", "Sign Language Bill", "Korean Sign Language Bill" and "Sign Language and Deaf Culture Standard Policy", which were then merged as The Fundamental Law of Korean Sign Language. The legislation opens the way for better access and improved communication in education, employment, medical and legal settings, as well as religious and cultural practices.  Proposals within the legislation consisted of the national and regional policy and the enactment for education of Korean Sign Language which promotes and distributes the information for creating a better environment to use Korean Sign Language. Furthermore, the Korean Sign Language Improvement Planning needs to be conducted every five years and research and investigation of the use of Korean Sign Language for the Deaf need to be conducted every three years. 

The Korean Sign Language Act, which was adopted on 3 February 2016 and came into force on 4 August 2016, established Korean Sign Language as an official language for the Deaf in South Korea equal in status with Korean. The law also stipulates that the national and local governments are required to provide translation services in Korean Sign Language to Deaf individuals who need them. 

The Korean Sign Language is managed and catalogued by the National Institute of the Korean Language (NIKL), which is a government agency tasked with providing authoritative commentary on Korean language in general. The NIKL, along with the Ministry of Culture, Sports, and Tourism, has worked to standardize KSL starting in 2000, publishing the first official KSL dictionary in 2005, as well as a common phrasebook by 2012. However, the current resources for KSL produced by the government have been criticized for not representing the language used by native signers due to a lack of inclusion from them and being based on artificial translation from spoken Korean. Reportedly, the quality of KSL interpretation as used in the public sphere is poor, with "far lower than 50 percent" of the intended message being understood by Deaf people in standard media interpretations. The officially sanctioned signs for LGBT concepts have been particularly disparaged for being stigmatizing and overly sexualized, and an advocacy group named Korean Deaf LGBT was formed in 2019 to find and create alternative and new signs, which were first disseminated in 2021 and have gained significant usage among Deaf LGBT communities, allies and human rights groups.

Functional markers 
KSL, like other sign languages, incorporates nonmanual markers with lexical, syntactic, discourse, and affective functions. These include brow raising and furrowing, frowning, head shaking and nodding, and leaning and shifting the torso.

See also
 Korean manual alphabet

Notes

References
 Brentari, Diane. (2010). Sign Languages. Cambridge: Cambridge University Press. ;  OCLC 428024472
 Wittmann, Henri (1991). "Classification linguistique des langues signées non vocalement," Revue québécoise de linguistique théorique et appliquée. Vol. 10, No. 1, pp. 215–288, 283.
 
 
Jhang, S. (2009). Notes on Korean Sign Language. In P. Li (Author) & C. Lee, G. Simpson, & Y. Kim (Eds.), The Handbook of East Asian Psycholinguistics (pp. 361-376). Cambridge: Cambridge University Press.

External links
Korean Sign Language Dictionary 

Japanese Sign Language family
Languages of South Korea